Georges Doussot (born 16 October 1901, date of death unknown) was a French boxer. He competed in the 1924 Summer Olympics. In 1924, Doussot was eliminated in the first round of the welterweight class after losing his fight to Al Mello.

References

External links

1901 births
Year of death missing
Welterweight boxers
Olympic boxers of France
Boxers at the 1924 Summer Olympics
French male boxers